Boqeh (also Romanized as Boq‘eh; also known as Bogh‘eh) is a village in Hayat Davud Rural District, in the Central District of Ganaveh County, Bushehr Province, Iran. At the 2006 census, its population was 25, in 4 families.

References 

Populated places in Ganaveh County